WHLM (930 kHz) is an AM radio station broadcasting and licensed to Bloomsburg, Pennsylvania, United States.

Until 2022, the station was owned by Columbia Broadcasting Company (not affiliated with CBS Radio). The Columbia Broadcasting Company also owned WBWX (which serves as a satellite station of WHLM), and a second company called Columbia FM Inc., which formerly owned WMMZ. Until the sale, the stations studio was located on East Main Street in downtown Bloomsburg, Pennsylvania. Presently, WHLM's main studio is located on Route 204 in Selinsgrove.

History 
In the fall of 1947, two brand new radio stations signed on-the-air in Bloomsburg, Pennsylvania. The Morning Press (now Press Enterprise) signed on 930 WCNR and a group of local business people signed on 690 WLTR.
	
In September 1951, Harry L. Magee of Magee Industrial Enterprises changed the call letters of WLTR to WHLM.
	
In October 1953, daytime only WHLM moved to 550 AM, a full-time channel and WHLM became Bloomsburg's first 24-hour radio station.
	
In September 1956, Harry built and signed on WHLM-FM (106.5).
	
In 1966, The Morning Press sold WCNR to station manager Ed Darlington.
	
In 1998, the Press Enterprise petitioned the Federal Communications Commission for a waiver to buy back WCNR.
	
In 1998, Magee Industrial Enterprises sold WHLM and WHLM-FM to the Sunbury Broadcasting Corporation. Under this ownership, they shut down WHLM (550 AM) and later changed the WHLM-FM call letters to WFYY, "Flight 106.5", which was later renamed "Y106.5", and is now "Bigfoot Country".
	
In April 2001, the Press Enterprise shut down WCNR. In September of that year, Joe Reilly formed the Columbia Broadcasting Company and purchased the assets of WCNR from the Press Enterprise. The studios, offices and historic call letters were restored in the WHLM Building on the Square in Downtown Bloomsburg. The station signed back on-the-air as "The New 930 WHLM."

On March 21, 2022, the Press Enterprise reported that owner Joe Reilly would sell the entirety of the Columbia Broadcasting Company to Seven Mountains Media for $450,000. The sale did not include the stations' studios location. The sale would make WHLM a sister station to WCFT-FM, which used to hold the WHLM callsign.

The sale closed on August 31 of that year; owner and morning DJ Joe Reilly would retire after his show that morning, voluntarily ending a radio career spanning over 50 years. Just after 1 p.m. on September 1, the classic hits format would sign off, with Billy Joel's "Movin' Out (Anthony's Song)" and Supertramp's "Goodbye Stranger" as the final two songs played. The final Fox News Radio update ran at the top of the hour, followed by about two hours of dead air. Shortly after 3 p.m., the entire Columbia cluster of stations would begin stunting with a loop of "Pop" by NSYNC, while redirecting former WHLM listeners to the duo of WHNA/WNNA and promoting a new format to debut the following Tuesday, September 6, at 10 a.m. At that time, WHLM/WBWX flipped to hot adult contemporary as "Pop Radio".

Former logo

References

External links

HLM
Columbia County, Pennsylvania
Radio stations established in 1947
1947 establishments in Pennsylvania